The qualifying rounds of the 2014 CAF Confederation Cup were played from 7 February to 27 April 2014, to decide the eight teams which advanced to the group stage.

Draw
The draw for the preliminary, first and second qualifying rounds was held on 16 December 2013 in Marrakech, Morocco. The entry round of each team was determined by their ranking points calculated based on performances in continental club championships for the period 2009–2013.

Format
Qualification ties were played on a home-and-away two-legged basis. If the sides were level on aggregate after the second leg, the away goals rule was applied, and if still level, the tie proceeded directly to a penalty shoot-out (no extra time was played).

Schedule
The schedule of each round was as follows.

Preliminary round
The preliminary round included the 42 teams that did not receive byes to the first round.

|}

CARA Brazzaville won 5–1 on aggregate and advanced to the first round.

AFC Leopards won 4–1 on aggregate and advanced to the first round.

SuperSport United won 3–0 on aggregate and advanced to the first round.

AS Kigali won 2–1 on aggregate and advanced to the first round.

Difaâ El Jadidi won 1–0 on aggregate and advanced to the first round.

Gamtel won 3–0 on aggregate and advanced to the first round.

Medeama won 4–1 on aggregate and advanced to the first round.

Ferroviário da Beira won 2–1 on aggregate and advanced to the first round.

3–3 on aggregate. St Michel United won the penalty shoot-out and advanced to the first round.

How Mine won 6–1 on aggregate and advanced to the first round.

3–3 on aggregate. AS Kondzo won on the away goals rule and advanced to the first round.

CS Constantine won 4–3 on aggregate and advanced to the first round.

Red Lions advanced to the first round after Estrela de Cantanhez withdrew.

Club Olympique de Bamako won 2–1 on aggregate and advanced to the first round.

1–1 on aggregate. MK Etanchéité won on the away goals rule and advanced to the first round.

Petro de Luanda won 3–2 on aggregate and advanced to the first round.

Ebusua Dwarfs won 1–0 on aggregate and advanced to the first round.

AS Douanes Lomé won 3–1 on aggregate and advanced to the first round.

CS Don Bosco won 3–1 on aggregate and advanced to the first round.

Union Douala won 4–2 on aggregate and advanced to the first round.

Desportivo da Huíla won 4–3 on aggregate and advanced to the first round.

First round
The first round included 32 teams: the 21 winners of the preliminary round, and the 11 teams that received byes to this round.

|}

Étoile du Sahel won 3–1 on aggregate and advanced to the second round.

SuperSport United won 4–2 on aggregate and advanced to the second round.

1–1 on aggregate. AS Kigali won the penalty shoot-out and advanced to the second round.

Difaâ El Jadidi won 6–0 on aggregate and advanced to the second round.

Medeama won 4–2 on aggregate and advanced to the second round.

ZESCO United won 1–0 on aggregate and advanced to the second round.

How Mine won 6–4 on aggregate and advanced to the second round.

Bayelsa United won 2–0 on aggregate and advanced to the second round.

CS Constantine won 3–0 on aggregate and advanced to the second round.

ASEC Mimosas won 3–1 on aggregate and advanced to the second round.

0–0 on aggregate. Ismaily won the penalty shoot-out and advanced to the second round.

Petro de Luanda won 4–2 on aggregate and advanced to the second round.

Wadi Degla won 3–1 on aggregate and advanced to the second round.

2–2 on aggregate. Djoliba won on the away goals rule and advanced to the second round.

Warri Wolves won 4–3 on aggregate and advanced to the second round.

CA Bizertin won 3–0 on aggregate and advanced to the second round.

Second round
The second round included the 16 winners of the first round.

|}

Étoile du Sahel won 5–1 on aggregate and advanced to the play-off round.

Difaâ El Jadidi won 3–1 on aggregate and advanced to the play-off round.

Medeama won 2–1 on aggregate and advanced to the play-off round.

Bayelsa United won 3–2 on aggregate and advanced to the play-off round.

ASEC Mimosas won 6–1 on aggregate and advanced to the play-off round.

Petro de Luanda won 1–0 on aggregate and advanced to the play-off round.

2–2 on aggregate. Djoliba won the penalty shoot-out and advanced to the play-off round.

CA Bizertin won 2–1 on aggregate and advanced to the play-off round.

Play-off round
The play-off round included 16 teams: the eight winners of the Confederation Cup second round and the eight losers of the Champions League second round.

The draw for the play-off round was held on 1 April 2014, 11:00 UTC+2, at the CAF Headquarters in Cairo, Egypt. The winners of the Confederation Cup second round were drawn against the losers of the Champions League second round, with the former hosting the second leg. Four ties contained a seeded loser of the Champions League second round (Pot A) and an unseeded winner of the Confederation Cup second round (Pot B), and the other four ties contained a seeded winner of the Confederation Cup second round (Pot C) and an unseeded loser of the Champions League second round (Pot D). The seeding of each team was determined by their ranking points calculated based on performances in continental club championships for the period 2009–2013.

The following 16 teams were entered into the draw:

The winners of each tie advanced to the group stage.

|}

2–2 on aggregate. Al-Ahly won on the away goals rule and advanced to the group stage.

AS Real Bamako won 2–1 on aggregate and advanced to the group stage.

2–2 on aggregate. AC Léopards won the penalty shoot-out and advanced to the group stage.

ASEC Mimosas won 3–1 on aggregate and advanced to the group stage.

Coton Sport won 4–3 on aggregate and advanced to the group stage.

Étoile du Sahel won 1–0 on aggregate and advanced to the group stage.

Séwé Sport won 3–0 on aggregate and advanced to the group stage.

1–1 on aggregate. Nkana won on the away goals rule and advanced to the group stage.

References

External links
Orange CAF Confederation Cup 2014, CAFonline.com

1